Michael Künzel (born 24 May 1973) is a German former speed skater. He competed at the 1998 Winter Olympics and the 2002 Winter Olympics.

References

External links
 

1973 births
Living people
German male speed skaters
Olympic speed skaters of Germany
Speed skaters at the 1998 Winter Olympics
Speed skaters at the 2002 Winter Olympics
People from Plauen
Sportspeople from Saxony
20th-century German people
21st-century German people